Microchlamylla amabilis is a species of sea slug, an aolid nudibranch, a marine gastropod mollusk in the family Flabellinidae.

Description
This species grows to about 26 mm in length. The dorsal midline of the tail contains a white line.

Distribution
Microchlamylla amabilis is known to occur only in Oshoro Bay (waters off Otaru, Hokkaidō), Japan.

References

 Korshunova, T.; Martynov, A.; Bakken, T.; Evertsen, J.; Fletcher, K.; Mudianta, W.; Saito, H.; Lundin, K.; Schrödl, M.; Picton, B. (2017). Polyphyly of the traditional family Flabellinidae affects a major group of Nudibranchia: aeolidacean taxonomic reassessment with descriptions of several new families, genera, and species (Mollusca, Gastropoda). ZooKeys. 717: 1-139

Flabellinidae
Gastropods described in 1991